Route 241 or Highway 241 may refer to:

Canada
 Manitoba Provincial Road 241
 Prince Edward Island Route 241
 Quebec Route 241

Costa Rica
 National Route 241

Japan
 Japan National Route 241

United States
 U.S. Route 241 (former)
U.S. Route 241 (1926)
U.S. Route 241 (1930s)
 Alabama State Route 241
 Arkansas Highway 241
 California State Route 241
 Florida State Road 241 (former)
 Georgia State Route 241
 Indiana State Road 241
 Kentucky Route 241
 Maryland Route 241 (former)
 Minnesota State Highway 241
 Montana Secondary Highway 241
 New Mexico State Road 241
 New York State Route 241
 North Carolina Highway 241
 Ohio State Route 241
 Oregon Route 241
 Pennsylvania Route 241
 Tennessee State Route 241
 Texas State Highway 241 (former)
 Texas State Highway Spur 241
 Farm to Market Road 241
 Utah State Route 241
 Virginia State Route 241
 Washington State Route 241
 Wisconsin Highway 241
 Wyoming Highway 241